Utica, also known as Utica Mills, is an unincorporated community located in Frederick County, Maryland, United States, at the intersection of Old Frederick Road and Lenhart Road.

It is home to St. Paul's Evangelical Lutheran Church.

The Utica Covered Bridge, also known as the Utica Mills Covered Bridge, is located nearby.

History 

During the Civil War, the 18th Regiment Massachusetts Volunteer Infantry arrived at the outskirts of Utica on Tuesday, July 7, 1863.

Dr. George F. Smith, one of the first druggists to serve Coca-Cola, and founder of the Rosebud Perfume Company in Woodsboro, Maryland, taught school in Utica for five years, before becoming a druggist in 1902.

References 

Populated places in Frederick County, Maryland